Stigmella betulicola is a moth of the family Nepticulidae. It is found in most of Europe (except Iceland, the Iberian Peninsula and most of the Balkan Peninsula), east to the eastern part of the Palearctic realm.

The wingspan is 3.4-4.6 mm. The head in male is ochreous yellowish, in female more orange, collar light yellowish. Antennal eyecaps yellow -whitish. Forewings shining deep purplish bronze; a shining golden -silvery fascia about 3/4 apical area beyond this deep fuscous-purple. Hindwings grey. Adults are on wing in May and again in August. There are two generations per year.

The larvae feed on Betula species, including Betula pubescens, Betula pendula, Betula humilis and Betula nana. They mine the leaves of their host. The mine is short, with frass irregular, linear. There are often several mines in a leaf. The mines are found frequently on seedlings and small plants

References

External links
bladmineerders.nl
UKmoths
Swedish moths
Fauna Europaea
 Stigmella betulicola images at  Consortium for the Barcode of Life
 

Nepticulidae
Moths of Asia
Moths of Europe
Taxa named by Henry Tibbats Stainton
Moths described in 1856